Cheryl Rixon (born 12 October 1954 in Perth, Western Australia) is an Australian actress and model. She was chosen as the December 1977 Pet Of The Month for Penthouse and two years later as Pet of the Year in 1979. Rixon now lives in the US and designs jewelry which she sells under the name of 'Royal Order'. She is married to club owner Art Davis with whom she has two sons, Dylan and Luke Davis.

Early career
In the early 1970s, Rixon was twice a finalist in the annual Miss West Coast bikini beauty pageant, staged in Perth each January. She later appeared as a game show assistant on local TV.

After appearing in obscure low-budget sex-comedy film Plugg (1975), shot in Perth, Rixon moved interstate to Melbourne and acted in several television roles for Crawford Productions. She played three different roles during the final episodes of the Crawford production Homicide.

Starting in mid-1975 Rixon also began making appearances in Crawford Production's sex-comedy soap opera The Box. Playing television starlet Angela O'Malley, she made several appearances in the series. She left The Box towards the end of 1975, but returned for a three-month stint starting in February 1976.

Rixon subsequently found fame in the US as Penthouse magazine's December 1977 Pet Of The Month and in October 1979,she was chosen as the Pet Of The Year in a televised pageant held at the Aladdin Hotel in Las Vegas, Nevada. Her pictorial followed the following month in the November 1979 issue, where she graced the cover as well. In July 1980 she kicked off New York Mayor Ed Koch's "Festival of Fragrances". She was again showcased with a ten-page spread in Penthouse in 1980, and posed for Oui magazine in November 1982,where she was also on the cover. During this period she appeared in films such as The Eyes of Laura Mars and Used Cars.
Rixon did not receive the Penthouse prizes that had been promised to her and in 1985 took the magazine’s publisher to the New York State Supreme Court, which ruled that she was entitled to them. The judgment was later affirmed on appeal.

Partial filmography

Television
 The Box (1975–1976) as Angela O’Malley
 Homicide (1976–1977) 3 Guest roles Wendy / Belinda / Prostitute
 Telethon '79 (1979) (TV special) Herself
 Penthouse Pet Of The Year 1980 (1980) (TV special US) Herself

Film
 Plugg (1975) as Kelli Kelly
   Eyes Of Laura Mars (1978) as Extra
 Swap Meet (1979) as Annie
 Used Cars (1980) as Margaret
 I Like to Play Games (1995) as Sean
 Dark Secrets (1996) as Philipa
 Scorpio Men On Prozac (2010, as Cheryl Rixon Davis) as Mrs. Everyman

See also
 List of Penthouse Pets of the Year

References

External links

1954 births
Living people
Actresses from Perth, Western Australia
Australian film actresses
Glamour models
Australian television actresses
Penthouse Pets of the Year